CIR or Cir may refer to:

Locations
 Cairo Regional Airport, FAA/IATA code, CIR
 CIR, station code for the Caledonian Road & Barnsbury railway station in the UK
 Christmas Island Resort, a casino/resort in the northeastern Indian Oceans

Organizations
 Center for Individual Rights, a US non-profit public interest law firm
 Center for Investigative Reporting, a nonprofit journalism organization
 Christian Initiative Romero, a German non-profit organization supporting industrial law and human rights in Central America
 Cosmetic Ingredient Review, a consumer safety group

Politics and government
 Commissioner of Internal Revenue, a US Treasury position
 Committee on International Relations, renamed the United States House Committee on Foreign Affairs in 2007
 Comprehensive Immigration Reform Act of 2006, a US Senate bill
 Convention of Republican Institutions, a defunct French political party
 Citizen initiated Referendum, a type of referendum initiated by the signature of a certain minimum number of registered voters
 Cyber and Information Domain Service (Germany) (German: Cyber- und Informationsraum; CIR), the cyber branch of Germany's military

Science and medicine
 CIR (gene), a gene that encodes the protein corepressor interacting with RBPJ in humans
 Carbon isotope ratio analysis, a subset of isotope ratio mass spectrometry
 Central ischaemic response, a cause of fainting
 Co-rotating interaction region, the interface between fast and slow regions of the solar wind
 Cir, abbreviation for the constellation Circinus

Technology
 Carrier-to-interference ratio, in radio transmission
 Color infrared film, in photography
 Combustion Integrated Rack, an International Space Station microgravity research tool
 Committed information rate, or minimum guaranteed bitrate, in telecommunications
 Consumer IR, a class of remote control and communication devices

Other uses
 Committee on International Relations (University of Chicago), a graduate program
 CIR Group, an Italian holding company
 Coordinator for International Relations, a position within the Japan Exchange and Teaching Program
 Cost/income ratio, a financial ratio
 The Cox–Ingersoll–Ross model for interest rate dynamics
 Campionato Italiano Rally (Italian Rally Championship), in automobile racing
 Arctic Circle Air, ICAO code